The canton of Salon-de-Provence-1 is an administrative division of the Bouches-du-Rhône department, in southeastern France. It was created at the French canton reorganisation which came into effect in March 2015. Its seat is in Salon-de-Provence.

It consists of the following communes: 

Aureille
Les Baux-de-Provence
Eygalières
Eyguières
Fontvieille
Lamanon
Mas-Blanc-des-Alpilles
Maussane-les-Alpilles
Mouriès
Orgon
Paradou
Saint-Étienne-du-Grès
Saint-Rémy-de-Provence
Salon-de-Provence (partly)
Sénas

References

Cantons of Bouches-du-Rhône